Peyronellaea curtisii (leaf scorch) is a fungal plant pathogen first described by Miles Joseph Berkeley and received its current name in 2010.
 Formerly it was Stagonospora (syn. Stagonosporopsis) curtisii. It is a cause of leaf blotch, and its substrates include Narcissus, Galanthus and Hippeastrum.

Symptoms
Peyronellaea curtisii causes red-brown spots on leaf tips of Narcissus and other members of the family Amaryllidaceae; this gives them a scorched appearance that is easily mistaken for frost damage. A yellowish discolouration then spreads down the leaf; more spots may develop as the leaf withers, turns brown and die away. Minute black fungal fruiting bodies may be visible on the foliage. The flowers and flower stalks may also display brown spots and marks.

On hippeastrum bulbs the fungus causes red spots that may develop into soft, sunken patches. Leaf scorch fungus can also affect other members of the Amaryllidaceae, including Amaryllis, Crinum, Nerine, Sprekelia and Sternbergia.

References

Bibliography 
 
 

Fungal plant pathogens and diseases
Pleosporales
Fungi described in 2010